Ixora coccinea (also known as jungle geranium, flame of the woods or jungle flame or pendkuli) is a species of flowering plant in the family Rubiaceae. It is a common flowering shrub native to Southern India, Bangladesh, and Sri Lanka. It has become one of the most popular flowering shrubs in South Florida gardens and landscapes. It is the national flower of Suriname. Commercially important medicinal plant, used in ayurveda. All parts including flower, leaves and root are taken for various medicinal preparations for skin disease, Diabetes etc

Description

It has a rounded form, with a spread that may exceed its height.

Cultivation and use

Although there are around 500 species in the genus Ixora, only a handful are commonly cultivated, and the common name, Ixora, is usually used for I. coccinea. I. coccinea is used in warm climates for hedges and screens, foundation plantings, massed in flowering beds, or grown as a specimen shrub or small tree. In cooler climes, it is grown in a greenhouse or as a potted house plant requiring bright light. I. coccinea is also grown in containers, looking very distinguished as a patio or poolside plant. This tight, compact shrub is much branched and tolerates hard pruning, making it ideal for formal hedges, although it is at its best when not sheared.

There are numerous named cultivars differing in flower colour (yellow, pink, orange) and plant size. Several popular cultivars are dwarfs, usually staying under  in height. Nora Grant is a popular dwarf and Super King is a popular hybrid with much larger flower clusters. Many new cultivars and hybrids of I. coccinea have come to market in the last couple of decades, leading to a resurgence in popularity for the beautiful flame-of-the-woods.

The flowers, leaves, roots, and the stem are used to treat various ailments in the Indian traditional system of medicine, the Ayurveda, and in various folk medicines, in traditional Indian medicine the fusion of juice leaves and the fruit of Ixora coccinea is used to care for dysentery, ulcers and gonorrhea.

Chemical constituents
Phytochemical studies indicate that the plant contains the phytochemicals lupeol, ursolic acid, oleanolic acid, sitosterol, rutin, lecocyanadin, anthocyanins, proanthocyanidins, and glycosides of kaempferol and quercetin.

Ixora cultivars

References

External links

Floridata - Jungle Geranium
Florida Gardener - Jungle Geranium
College of Micronesia - Jungle Geranium
World Checklist of Rubiaceae

coccinea
Garden plants of Asia
National symbols of Suriname
Plants described in 1753
Taxa named by Carl Linnaeus